The Langara Formation is a geologic formation in Norway. It preserves fossils dating back to the Katian to Hirnantian (Rawtheyan) stages of the Ordovician period.

See also 
 List of fossiliferous stratigraphic units in Norway

References 

Geologic formations of Norway
Ordovician System of Europe
Ordovician Norway
Hirnantian
Katian
Limestone formations
Shale formations
Siltstone formations
Ordovician southern paleotemperate deposits
Paleontology in Norway